Perspective is the second studio album released by four-piece British band Lawson. The album was released on 8 July 2016. The album was preceded by the singles "Roads", "Money" and "Where My Love Goes". The album was recorded over the course of two years. Initial recording took place between March 2014 and April 2015; with additional recording sessions taking place between January and March 2016. The album introduces a more progressive and adult sound for the band, incorporating elements of synthpop amongst a heavier selection of electronic guitars.

Background
Singer Andy Brown said of the album title; "The word "Perspective" was the perfect album title, you know with everything I've been through personally over the last few years health-wise and changing perspective on life, so couldn't have been more perfect for me." The standard version of the album was released via iTunes while an exclusive version of the album containing seven bonus tracks was released as part of a box set through the band's official store.

Singles
 "Roads" was the first single to be released from the album on 24 May 2015. The single reached number 11 on the UK Singles Chart.
 "Money" was released as the album's second single on 18 March 2016. The single did not chart as well as its predecessor, and did not peak inside the top 100.
 "Where My Love Goes" was released as the album's third single on 13 May 2016. The music video was released on 19 May, and depicts Andy proposing to his girlfriend, Joey McDowall.

Track listing

Charts

Release history

References

2016 albums
Polydor Records albums
Lawson (band) albums